Qubaybat Abu al-Huda is a Syrian village located in the Suran Subdistrict in Hama District. According to the Syria Central Bureau of Statistics (CBS), Qubaybat Abu al-Huda had a population of 402 in the 2004 census.

References 

Populated places in Hama District